Bilge Olgaç (10 January 1940 – 3 March 1994) was a Turkish film director.

Life
Bilge Olgaç was born to a poor family in Vize, ilçe (district)  of Kırklareli Province on 10 January 1940. While still in vocational school in İstanbul, she married Vecdi Bender in 1956. She had a son by this marriage. They divorced. In 1994, she had moved to a new house in Beyoğlu, İstanbul. She died during a fire in this house on 3 March 1994.

Career
She was writing short stories. Her husband, who was a film industry employee, introduced her to Memduh Ün, a film producer and a director. In 1962, Memduh Ün made a film out of one of her stories Kısmetin En Güzeli ("Best of the Fortune"). She also began working as an assistant of Memduh Ün. In 1965, she directed her first film Üçünüze de Mıhlarım ("I Shall Shoot Three of You"). She was the sole female film director at that time. She also wrote the script of many of her films.  In 1970, she directed Linç ("Lynch"), which  earned her fame and many awards. Between 1975 and 1984, she directed commercial films. In 1984, she returned to movie films by her new film Kaşık Düşmanı ("Ball and Chain"). In the same year, she also made Yavrularım ("My Little Ones"), which was a big success. Her later films are on women's issues in rural areas. Although she mostly made movie films in 1987, she also directed a television serial Elif Ana-Ayşe Kız ("Mommy Elif – Maid Ayşe"). When she died she was about to finish her last film Bir Yanımız Bahar Bahçe ("Spring Garden on One Side")  The number of films directed by Bilge Olgaç is 37.

Legacy
The annual awards given by the Flying Broom International Women's Film Festival are named after Bilge Olgaç.

Awards
1970: Linç International Adana Film Festival (Altın Koza) Best Director
1984: Kaşık Düşmanı International Antalya Film Festival (Altın Portakal) Best Screenplay
1985: Kaşık Düşmanı Créteil International Women's Film Festival Grand Prix

References

1940 births
People from Vize
Turkish female screenwriters
Turkish women film directors
Best Director Golden Boll Award winners
Best Screenplay Golden Orange Award winners
1994 deaths
Deaths from fire
20th-century Turkish screenwriters